The 2017 season is Liverpool Ladies Football Club's 28th season of competitive football and its seventh season in the FA Women's Super League and at the top level of English women's football, being one of the league's foundation clubs.

Following a reorganisation of top-level women's football in England, the 2017 season will only cover half of a traditional season's length, while the FA WSL shifts its calendar to match the traditional autumn-to-spring axis of football in Europe. For the same reason, there is no Champions League qualification nor relegation to be competed for.

On 19 April 2017, Liverpool Ladies FC announced a landmark shirt sponsorship deal with beauty and cosmetics company Avon Products. This three-year agreement will see Avon become the first independent shirt sponsor for the club, replacing Standard Chartered from the men's side. As part of the agreement, Avon will also become Liverpool Ladies FC's principal partner and ladies beauty partner.

First team

Last updated on 18 May 2017

New contracts

Transfers and loans

Transfers in

Transfers out

Loans out

Pre-season

Competitions

Women's Super League

Results summary

Results by matchday

Matches

FA Cup

Statistics

Appearances and goals

Players without any appearance are not included.

|-
|colspan="14"|Goalkeepers:
|-

|-
|colspan="14"|Defenders:
|-

|-
|colspan="14"|Midfielders:
|-

|-
|colspan="14"|Forwards:
|-

|-
|colspan="14"|Players who left the club during the season:
|-

Goalscorers
Includes all competitive matches. The list is sorted by squad number when total goals are equal.

Clean sheets 
Includes all competitive matches. The list is sorted by squad number when total clean sheets are equal.

Honours

 2016–17 PFA Players' Player of the Year:  Caroline Weir (finalist)
 2016–17 PFA Young Player of the Year:  Caroline Weir (finalist)
 2016–17 PFA Team of the Year:  Caroline Weir

References

2017